Cosmophasis olorina is a species of spider of the family Salticidae. It is endemic to Sri Lanka. Only the male has been described.

Taxonomy
C. olorina was first described as Telamonia olorina in "Descriptions d'arachnides noveaux de la familie des Attidae (suite)" by Eugène Simon in 1901. Then, in 1984, Jerzy Prószyński moved it to Cosmophasis.

References

Salticidae
Spiders of Asia
Arthropods of Sri Lanka
Endemic fauna of Sri Lanka
Spiders described in 1901
Taxa named by Eugène Simon